Ewha Girls' Foreign Language High School (이화여자외국어고등학교/梨花女子外國語高等學校) is a foreign language high school located in Sunhwa-dong, Jung-gu, Seoul, Korea.

School motto
Freedom, Love, Peace.

School philosophy
Educating women leaders who can bring freedom, love, and peace to the world and history with the nature of Christianity.

Notable alumnae
Shin A-young, announcer
Lim Yoon-sun, lawyer

References

High schools in Seoul
Language high schools in South Korea
Jung District, Seoul
Educational institutions established in 1992
Christian schools in South Korea
Girls' schools in South Korea
Private schools in South Korea
1992 establishments in South Korea